Casillo is an Italian surname. Notable people with the surname include:

Alessandro Casillo (born 1996), Italian singer
Vincenzo Casillo (1942–1983), Italian Camorrista

See also
Castillo (surname)

Italian-language surnames